The Terrace Theater is a full theatrical and performance venue located in Long Beach, California.  The theater seats 3,051 patrons at its maximum configuration in Orchestra, Loge, and Balcony sections.  The Orchestra seating section is arranged in the Continental seating style with no center aisle and two exits for every four rows in the theater.  The Terrace is one of the venues in the Long Beach Convention and Entertainment Center.  It is attached to the 825-seat Center Theater.

The theater was completed in 1978, replacing the Long Beach Municipal Auditorium, which had been demolished in 1975.

The theater accommodates a wide variety of events including local performances, church services, dance competitions, beauty pageants, Broadway touring productions, industrial conventions, symphony performances, and operas.  It is the current home to the Long Beach Symphony Orchestra.  The theater is maintained and run by the Stagehand Department of the Long Beach Convention and Entertainment Center.

In 1978 Richard Pryor's performance was filmed and recorded. Richard Pryor: Live in Concert was released to theaters in 1979.

References

External links 
 Long Beach Convention and Entertainment Center

Concert halls in California
Culture of Long Beach, California
Buildings and structures in Long Beach, California
Music venues in California
Theatres in Los Angeles County, California